The Great Synagogue in Plzeň, Czech Republic is the second largest synagogue in Europe.

History
A Viennese architect Max Fleischer drew up the original plans for the synagogue in Gothic style with granite buttresses and twin 65-meter towers. The cornerstone was laid on 2 December 1888 and that was about as far as it got. City councillors rejected the plan in a clear case of tower envy as they felt that the grand erection would compete with the nearby Cathedral of St. Bartholomew.

Emmanuel Klotz put forward a new design in 1890 retaining the original ground plan and hence the cornerstone, but lowering the towers by 20m and creating the distinctive look combining Romantic and neo-Renaissance styles covered with Oriental decorations and a giant Star of David. The design was quickly approved and master builder Rudolf Štech completed work in 1893 for the bargain price of 162,138 florins. At the time the Jewish community in Plzeň numbered some 2,000.

The mixture of styles is truly bewildering; from the onion domes of a Russian Orthodox church, to the Arabic style ceiling, to the distinctly Indian looking Torah ark. The synagogue was used without interruption until the Nazi occupation of World War II. The synagogue was used as a storage facility during the war and was thereby spared from destruction. The Jewish community that retook possession of the synagogue at the end of hostilities had been decimated by the Holocaust. The last regular service was held in 1973, when the synagogue was closed down and fell into disrepair under communist rule.

Restoration was undertaken from 1995 to 1998, and the synagogue was reopened on 11 February 1998 at a cost of 63 million CZK. The central hall is now often used for concerts from such legends as Joseph Malowany, Peter Dvorský, or Karel Gott, while the walls host temporary photographic exhibitions of various causes.  The synagogue is still used for worship, but only in what was formerly the winter prayer room. The present number of Plzeň Jews is a little over 70.

Gallery

See also
 History of the Jews in the Czech Republic

References

External links
 Short overview (in Czech)
 Details of architecture (in Czech)
 Picture of the interior

Ashkenazi Jewish culture in the Czech Republic
Ashkenazi synagogues
Buildings and structures in Plzeň
Moorish Revival synagogues
Reform Judaism in the Czech Republic
Reform synagogues
Romanesque Revival synagogues
Synagogue buildings with domes
Synagogues completed in 1892
Synagogues in the Czech Republic
Tourist attractions in the Plzeň Region
19th-century religious buildings and structures in the Czech Republic